The Immaculata prayer is a Traditional Catholic Marian prayer composed by Saint Maximillian Kolbe.

It is a prayer of consecration to the Immaculata, i.e. the immaculately conceived Virgin Mary.

The consecration prayer is as follows:

A shorter version of the prayer can be used for the daily renewal of the consecration:

References

Bibliography
 University of Dayton Marian prayers 
 Consecration.com 
 Women for Faith and Family 

Marian devotions